The insular horseshoe bat (Rhinolophus keyensis) is a species of bat in the family Rhinolophidae. It is endemic to Indonesia.

References

Rhinolophidae
Bats of Indonesia
Bat, Insular horseshoe
Endangered biota of Oceania
Mammals described in 1871
Taxonomy articles created by Polbot
Taxa named by Wilhelm Peters